This was the sixth season of Barnes Football Club.

Athletic Sports
 Date: 28 March 1868
 Venue: Field belonging to J. Johnstone, The White Hart, Mortlake.
 Committee: A. D. Houseman (starter), F. W. Bryant, R. W. Willis (judges), R. G. Graham (secretary, clerk of course).
 Events: 100 yards race, three-quarters of a mile handicap, 440 yards handicap, 220 yards hurdle race, one mile handicap steeplechase, high jump, high jump with pole, long jump

Notes

Barnes F.C. seasons
Barnes